Richard Bullock Andrews (11 May 1823 – 26 June 1884) was an Australian politician and judge.

Early life
Richard Bullock Andrews was born in Epping, Essex, England the eldest child of Richard Bullock Andrews, an attorney, and his wife Emma Ann. From December 1839 Bullock worked in his father's solicitors business. On 15 August 1846 he married Elizabeth Holtaway (29 August 1818 – 15 February 1906), daughter of a solicitor.

Andrews emigrated to South Australia, arriving there 14 December 1852 aboard the steamship Sydney. In 1853 he was appointed a notary public, on 3 May 1853 he was admitted to practice in the Supreme Court of South Australia. He practised in the Local Court at Mount Barker, South Australia and then set up an office in Adelaide.

Politics
In June 1857 he was elected to the House of Assembly for Yatala and was Attorney-General of South Australia in the Torrens  ministry from 1 to 30 September. He was elected a member for Sturt in 1862 and was again attorney-general in the Dutton and Ayers ministries in 1863, 1865, 1867 and 1868. He had been made a Queen's Counsel (Q.C.) in 1865 and in January 1870 resigned from parliament to become crown solicitor and public prosecutor. In March 1881 he was appointed a judge of the Supreme Court. He fell into ill-health, was obliged to take six months leave of absence at the end of 1883 and died at Hobart on 26 June 1884 leaving a widow and a daughter, Agnes Reid Andrews, who married Mortimer, a son of William Giles, on 16 May 1874.

Legacy
Andrews was an excellent public prosecutor and had the attributes of a good judge. His health however gave him few opportunities of showing this during the short time he was on the bench. In private life he was an amateur viticulturist, planting  of vines; he made some good wines during the 1860s.

The Hundred of Andrews, proclaimed in 1864, an agricultural district straddling the Hill River near Spalding, was named after him.

Family
Andrews had a younger brother, William Buckton Andrews, who followed him to Adelaide in 1854, and as Canon Andrews became a celebrated and much loved leader of the Anglican Church, and whose daughter Alice Margaret married another son of William Giles.

Citations

References

Further reading
 
 

|-

|-

|-

|-

|-

Members of the South Australian House of Assembly
Attorneys-General of South Australia
Judges of the Supreme Court of South Australia
1823 births
1884 deaths
People from Epping
Australian King's Counsel
Colony of South Australia judges
19th-century Australian politicians